The Association for Ocular Pharmacology and Therapeutics (AOPT) is an organization that welcomes members from disciplines related to ocular pharmacology and its therapeutic applications. The mission of AOPT is the sustenance of a scientific network aiming the dissemination of knowledge in the field of ocular disease, pharmacology and therapeutics.

History
AOPT was begun informally in the 1970s by Dr. George Chiou as special sessions at the Federation of American Societies for Experimental Biology conferences. It grew to an official separate Symposium of Ocular Pharmacology meeting of academicians, clinicians, and pharmaceutical industry at Novi, Michigan in August 1993. The participants voted to charter the organization and this was accomplished the next year with the first AOPT meeting held in New Orleans, Louisiana in January 1995. The founding board comprised Drs. George Chiou (president), David Lee (vice-president), Hitoshi Shichi (treasurer), and Herbert Kaufman (trustee). During the early FASEB years, Chiou also established the Journal of Ocular Pharmacology, now the Journal of Ocular Pharmacology & Therapeutics. The history of AOPT is closely related to the Association for Research in Vision and Ophthalmology (ARVO).

Activity
The mission of AOPT is to help researchers and eye-care professionals in their efforts toward the understanding and the treatment of eye diseases. AOPT scientific dissemination involves preclinical and clinical pharmacologists and researchers. Scientific dissemination is promoted through biennial meetings  and the peer-reviewed journal: Journal of Ocular Pharmacology and Therapeutics (JOPT).

Journal
JOPT is the official journal of AOPT. It is a multidisciplinary journal that covers the latest findings related to pharmacodynamics and pharmacokinetics of pharmaceuticals used in the treatment of ocular disorders.  The journal is published 10 times per year.  This journal is peer reviewed with on line access prior to journal publication and it is available in 170 countries (http://home.libertpub.com).  The journal also publishes Special Issues.  The next one is "Next Generation Tissue Engineering:  Inspired Models for Ophthalmic Drug Discovery".  (Ashwath Jayagopal and Héloïse Ragelle guest editors.  The current editor-in-chief of JOPT is W. Daniel Stamer, PhD.(Duke University, Durham, NC http://medschoolduke.edu/about-us/our-faculty/w-daniel-stamer ) On line ISSN 1557-7732 with an impact factor of 1.782.  Affiliated with AOPT and ISOPT Clinical ( International Symposium on Ocular Pharmacology & Therapeutics Clinical) (http://isopclinical.com)

Composition
AOPT has a diverse leadership and membership which include principal investigators, scientists, medical professionals, technicians, and students with an interest in ocular pharmacology and therapeutics. The directive committee and members come from academic institutions and private companies worldwide.

2018-2020 Board of directors

President: Dr. Filippo Drago
 Vice-President/President Elect: Dr. Ash Jayagopal
Immediate Past President:  Dr. Thomas Yurio
 Treasurer: Dr. Shusheng Wang
 Secretary: Dr. Cheryl Rowe-Rendleman
 Trustees: Dr. Sanjoy Bhattacharya, Dr. Claudio Bucolo,  Dr. Dorette Ellis, Dr. Shahid Husain, Dr. Goldis Malek, Dr. Najam Sharif, Dr. Dan Stamer, Dr. Chi-ho To, Dr. Heping Xu 
Social Media Trustee/Advisor: Dr. Malinda Fitzgerald
Advisor: Carol Toris

2015-2017 Board of directors 
 President: Dr. Thomas Yorio
 Vice-President: Dr. Filippo Drago
 Treasurer: Dr. Peter Kador
 Secretary: Dr. Carol Toris
 Trustees: Dr. Malinda Fitzgerald, Dr. Ash Jayagopal, Dr. Uday Kompella, Dr. Cameron Millar, Dr. Iok-Hou Pang, Dr. Ganesh Prasanna, Dr. Shusheng Wang, Dr. Christine Wildsoet

2013-2015 Board of directors
 President: Dr. Achim H. Krauss
 Vice-President: Dr. Thomas Yorio
 Treasurer: Dr. Ganesh Prasanna
 Secretary: Dr. Jeff Kiel
 Trustees: Dr. Abbot Clark, Dr. Julie Crider, Prof. Filippo Drago, Dr. Malinda Fitzgerald, Dr. Juana Gallar, Dr. Peter Kador, Dr. W. Daniel Stamer, Dr. Oliver Zeitz

Related societies
Members of AOPT and societies in the field of eye research, gather every year at the annual ARVO meeting, in which the latest findings in vision and ophthalmology research are disseminated.
Societies in the field of eye research span from preclinical to clinical and a few of these societies are hereby listed:
 ARVO (Association for Research in Vision and Ophthalmology)
 ISER (International Society for Eye Research)
 EVER (European Association for Vision and Eye Research)
 ISOPT (International Symposium on Ocular Pharmacology and Therapeutics)
 ASRS (American Society of Retinal Specialists)
 AGS (American Glaucoma Society)
 ASCRS (American Society of Cataract and Refractive Surgery)
 AAO (American Academy of Ophthalmology)
 AOA (American Optometric Association)
 NAEVR (The National Alliance for Eye and Vision Research)
 Societies of Pharmacology World-Wide

See also
 Eye
 Pharmacology

References

Health care-related professional associations based in the United States
Ophthalmology journals
Pharmacological societies